Silichy or Silichi is a ski resort situated in Lahojsk (or Logoysk), Belarus, located 30 km (18.64 mi) away from Minsk. Silichy was opened on January 29, 2005. The length of 3 routes for skiing is 2.5 km (1.55 mi), and it has a 4-chair elevator. 

The mountain skiing season starts in December and lasts until March (until there is no snow).

This resort is open all year round, with other activities than skiing.

References

External links 
 Tours & Excursions Belintourist.by

Ski areas and resorts in Belarus
Geography of Minsk Region
Tourist attractions in Minsk Region